Ramakrishna Mission Vidyalaya, Viveknagar is a school in Agartala, India. This icon of knowledge is a collaboration of the Hindu monastic order Ramakrishna Mission and the Government of Tripura. A group of monks and brahmacharis of the Ramakrishna Mission order manage the activities of the Vidyalaya, assisted by around sixty teaching and non-teaching staff.

The Ramakrishna Math and Mission is located at Viveknagar, a village contiguous to Amtali, around 9 km from the city of Agartala. The coordinates of the school campus are approximately between 23016" N & 24014" N and between 910 9" E & 910 47" E. The Ramakrishna Math and Mission, here, mainly operates in West Tripura District, the area of which is 3097.78 km2.

Viveknagar is about 560 km from Guwahati and 290 km from Silchar.

Infrastructure 

 Classrooms : Most of the several classrooms in the school are used to conduct regular classes. They are equipped with Smart Boards and Digital Screens for Presentations.
Laboratories : The school is equipped with laboratories for Physics, Chemistry, Biology, Mathematics and Informatics Practices. The school has a specialATLLab for conducting workshops and studies on Robotics and AI for students.
 Library : The school library houses more than 12,000 books on a wide range of subjects, mostly in English and Bengali. The most common genres are literature, scholastic reference, theology and extra-curricular knowledge.
Auditorium : The Vivekananda Sabhagriha serves as the hall for daily morning assembly as well as an auditorium for school programmes throughout the year. It can seat around 900 spectators, including the seats on the balcony.
 Art gallery : Saradadevi Chitrashala is one of the best art galleries in any school in Tripura. Every year, on Saraswati Puja, a famous annual art exhibition is held here which is handled by the students of the art exhibition committee. The exhibition has received positive reviews throughout the years.
Playgrounds : There are three major playgrounds inside the school campus, two of which are equipped with galleries. Along with annual sports meets, inter-house cricket and football tournaments, these grounds are used on school lunch periods for casual sports activities.
Medical Unit : Niramay is the school health centre for treatment of sick and injured students.
Boys' Hostels : The Boys Hostel complex consists of three main buildings, Premananda Dham,Bramhananda Dham and Akhananda Dham. The central kitchen Annapurna Dham is located in the same place. It serves as the kitchen facility for the hostelers and also houses a dining hall at the top floor which is used by the day scholars as mid day meal venue. The old school building is also located there. 
 Sri Ramakrishna Temple and Math : The main temple of the campus is located a minute walk away from the campus. It is opened to visitors. Every year, A Fair Ramakrishma Mela is Organised at the field near the Temple.

Ramakrishna Mission Vidyalaya Boys' Hostels
Ramakrishna Mission Boys’ Hostels (Premananda Dham, Brahmananda Dham and Akhandananda Dham) are the student residences of the Ramakrishna Mission Vidyalaya. This hostel was started on 26 May 1996. At present, the hostel has a strength of about 182 tribal and Non-tribal boys.

The Hostel is located in the Viveknagar Ramakrishna Mission Vidyalaya school campus, which provides a serene and congenial atmosphere for the all-round development of the hostellers.

References

http://www.rkmmviveknagar.org/
http://rkmv.edu.in/

See also
List of Ramakrishna Mission institutions
Sri Ramakrishna Vidyashala

Schools in Tripura
Education in Agartala
Schools affiliated with the Ramakrishna Mission